Poland will participate at the 2019 Summer Universiade in Napoli, Italia.

References

2019
Nations at the 2019 Summer Universiade
2019 in Polish sport